Frost/Nixon may refer to:

 The Nixon Interviews, a series of interviews between David Frost and Richard Nixon
 Frost/Nixon (play), a 2006 play written by Peter Morgan
 Frost/Nixon (film), the 2008 film adaptation of the play, directed by Ron Howard